Harvey Eakin (October 30, 1926 – January 13, 1973) was a NASCAR Grand National Series driver from Baltimore, Maryland who competed from 1954 to 1957.

Summary
During the course of 17 races, he never won or even got a finish in the "top ten." Eakin did race for 2,089 official NASCAR laps; bringing home $1,110 in the process ($ when adjusted for inflation). His average start is 35th place while 25th place was considered to be par for the course for Eakin. His only DNQ came at the 1955 Southern 500. The previous year at the 1954 Southern 500, Eakin started in 31st in his 1954 Nash vehicle and finished in 18th place; collecting $250 in the process ($ when adjusted for inflation).

Intermediate tracks were the most favored by Eakin; giving him an 18th-place finish on average. His weakness was on road courses where a 32nd-place finish was considered to be normal. Richmond Raceway was Eakin's favorite track because he would finish 15th place there on average. Raleigh Speedway was really not a good track for Eakin because of his tendency to finish in 33rd place there on average. Eakin has competed in the USAC Stock Car series on one occasion and was always considered to be an owner-driver.

Eakin wasn't a terrible driver, however, as he managed to get one "top-15" finish in addition to six "top-20" finishes. Nash and Ford were his preferred manufacturers when it came to NASCAR vehicles. Not all of Eakin's races were considered to be successes as he failed to complete 8 out of the 17 races that he competed in.

References

External links
 

1926 births
1973 deaths
NASCAR drivers
People from Maryland
American racing drivers
Racing drivers from Baltimore
Racing drivers from Maryland
Sportspeople from Baltimore